The term Jérémie Vespers refers to a massacre that took place in August, September and October 1964 in the Haitian town of Jérémie. It took place after a group of 13 young Haitians calling themselves "Jeune Haiti" landed on August 6, 1964 at Petite-Rivière-de-Dame-Marie with the intention of overthrowing the regime of François 'Papa Doc' Duvalier.

The victims were killed one by one by the Haitian Army, until the last two survivors, Louis Drouin and Marcel Numa, were captured alive, brought back to Port-au-Prince and shot in public against a cemetery wall on November 12, 1964.

Terminology
The massacre was called the "vespers" because many of the families killed by the regime are remembered as the families who took many aforementioned "vesper" picnic excursions.

Victims 
Several of the group were from the town of Jérémie. During two months that the army and the resistance group fought in the hills, the regime ordered the arrest and murder of Jeune Haiti's family members. 27 people were murdered, ranging in age from 85-year-old Mrs Chenier Villedrouin to 2-year-old Régine Sansaricq.

The murdered were:

 Louis Drouin Sr., father of Louis Drouin Jr.
 Louise Degraff, his wife
 Guy Drouin, brother of Louis Drouin Jr.
 Alice Drouin, sister of Louis Drouin Jr.
 Gérard Guilbaud, Alice's husband
 Mrs. Chenier Villedrouin (née Corinne Sansaricq) (85 years old), mother of Guy and Victor Villedrouin
 Victor Villedrouin
 Roseline Drouin, Guy Villedrouin's wife and sister of Louis Drouin Jr.
 Fernande Villedrouin, sister of Guy and Victor
 Guy Villedrouin, brother of Victor Villedrouin
 Adeline Chassagne, Victor Villedrouin's wife, and the aunt of Canadian indie rock band Arcade Fire's Régine Chassagne
 Lisa Villedrouin(18 years old), their daughter
 Frantz Villedrouin (16 years old) their son
 Pierre Sansaricq
 Louise Laforest, Pierre's wife
 Jean-Claude Sansaricq, their son
 Graziela Sansaricq, Jean-Claude's wife
 Lily Sansaricq, sister of Pierre Sansaricq
 Fred Sansaricq, son of Pierre
 Hubert Sansaricq, son of Pierre
 Reynold Sansaricq, son of Pierre
 Marie-Catherine Sansaricq (10 years old) daughter of Pierre
 Edith Laforest, Louise Laforest's sister
 Jean-Pierre Sansaricq (6 years old), son of Jean-Claude and Graziela
 Stéphane Sansaricq (4 years old), son of Jean-Claude and Graziela
 Régine Sansaricq (2 years old), daughter of Jean-Claude and Graziela
 Pierre-Richard Sansaricq
 Alphonze Bazile, son of Pierre and Vesta Bazile

See also 
 List of massacres in Haiti
Bishop Guy Sansaricq, the Catholic bishop whose cousins were among the victims and who opposed the Duvalier regime

References

External links
Fordi9.com - The 13 of "Jeune Haiti"

1964 in Haiti
History of Haiti
Mass murder in 1964
Massacres in 1964
Massacres in Haiti
August 1964 events in North America
September 1964 events in North America
October 1964 events in North America
Grand'Anse (department)